A kayak roll or Eskimo roll is the act of righting a capsized kayak by use of body motion and/or a paddle. Typically this is done by lifting the torso towards the surface, flicking the hips to right the kayak, and applying a small force by means of the paddle to assist the torso back over the boat.

The roll is an essential for paddlers who attempt serious whitewater (Class IV or greater), as exiting the boat and swimming gives the paddler less maneuverability and control, and thus leaves them more exposed than in the boat.

History 

The skill of righting a capsized kayak was devised by the hunter-gatherer societies that also developed the kayak as a hunting boat; the Aleut and Inuit. The Greenlandic Inuit used several techniques that allowed the kayak to be righted with or without a paddle, also using only one hand, or without hands at all. A survey in Greenland in 1911 found that of a total of 2,228 hunters with a kayak of their own, 867 were able to roll.

In 1605, some Inuit men and their kayaks were brought back to Europe by a Danish expedition; they gave a demonstration of rolling and racing against rowing boats in Copenhagen harbour, watched by King Christian IV. A similar exhibition was held at The Hague in 1625. Paul Egede, the teenaged son of a missionary living with the Inuit, was probably the first non-native to learn to roll a kayak in the 1730s. Rolling was demonstrated in 1889 at Sandviken, Norway by Oluf Dietrichson, a member of Nansen's 1888 Greenland expedition. With the rapid growth in the sport of kayaking in Europe and the USA during the 1920s, the ability to roll was popularised by an Austrian kayaker, Edi Hans Pawlata (1900–1966). Although not, as he claimed, the first European to acquire the skill, he developed a technique in which the hand grips the end of the paddle, which proved easy to master. His "Pawlata roll" is still sometimes taught to beginners. Greenlandic kalaaleq, Manasse Mathæussen (1915–1989), earned a living giving rolling demonstrations and kayak stunts for films. In 1949, he set a record by performing 10 successive rolls in 18 seconds.

Types of rolls 

There are many types of roll, which involve subtle variations on the common technique of combining a paddle stroke at the surface with a hip-flick. Different rolls are more or less useful in different situations. One key to all rolls is that the head comes out of the water last, following the paddler's torso—not first, which presents a non-hydrodynamic profile and tends to oppose the angular momentum which is the hallmark of a successful roll.

Thirty-five different types of roll and related maneuvers are performed at the Greenland Kayaking Championships. Different rolls have different purposes, such as righting the kayak if the arms are entangled or injured, if the paddle is lost, if the akuilisaq has come off or is not worn, or if the kayaker has to keep hold of something (in competition, an inflated avataq or an eight-kilogram weight),

A) Hip-Flick Rolls： 
As mentioned above, Hip-Flick Rolls are a category of kayak rolls that engage Hip-Flick to produce rotational force to right a capsized kayak.

Screw roll 
This is the main roll that is usually taught to beginners first and is often what is referred to as "the roll". It is good on open or flat water but requires a reasonably large area to perform well so can be less useful in tight spaces or on whitewater.

C-to-C roll 
The C-to-C roll is another common roll that tends to be used more on whitewater. The name was inspired by the two curved shapes adopted by the body during the roll.

Reverse Screw roll (a.k.a. "Back Deck Roll") 
As the name suggests this is similar to the screw roll but performed in reverse, it is often used in playboating or in general when the paddler goes over whilst on the back deck. In this scenario it is far quicker to perform this roll than to move the paddle into a set-up position for a more standard roll. The disadvantage of this roll is that it leaves the face exposed and poses some risk to the shoulder.

Hand roll 
This roll is a bit of a 'party trick' but can also be useful if the paddler has lost their paddle and is also useful in the game of canoe polo. It relies heavily on the hip-flick. It is also frequently used by paddlers who run big waterfalls, as landing at high speed without a paddle is considered to pose less risk than landing with a paddle.

Tallit paarlatsillugit timaannarmik (body roll, no-hand roll) 
Rolling up without a paddle, with the arms crossed against the chest throughout.

Obsolete rolls 
Some techniques are rarely used by modern paddlers. The Pawlata roll is performed while gripping the far end of one paddle blade and sweeping the other from front to back. The Steyr roll is a reverse Pawlata.  In the put across roll, one paddle blade is gripped while the rest of the paddle extends out at right angles to the kayak; the paddler pulls down on the paddle to right the kayak without any sweeping action. The storm roll utilises a vertical rather than horizontal sweeping action.

B) Non-Hip-Flick Roll： 
Non-Hip-Flick Rolls are a category of kayak rolls that engage No Hip-Flick to produce rotational force to right a capsized kayak.

Fong's Roll 
Fong's Roll is a non-hip-flick kayak roll, which uses hands as feet to rotate a capsized kayak, without any help from attaching devices.   Fong’s Roll just changes the source of rotational force (for righting the kayak) from the rolling knee (hip flick) to the hand pulling. The principle of “body follow through” remains unchanged.

See also
Kayak rescue

References 

 
 
 

Kayaking techniques
Traditional knowledge